"Nada Es Para Siempre" is a ballad written by Amaury Gutiérrez, produced by Sebastián Krys and performed by Puerto Rican-American singer-songwriter Luis Fonsi, It was released as the first single from sixth studio album Paso a Paso (2005). The song was the third number-one hit for Luis Fonsi. The song was featured in the soundtrack of Mexican telenovela Rebelde.

Background
The song was dedicated to Luis Fonsi's wife, Adamari López, who at the time had been diagnosed with breast cancer. The song was the second single released from the album, Paso a Paso, after "Estoy Perdido". "Nada Es Para Siempre" received a nomination for Pop Song of the Year at the Premios Lo Nuestro 2006 awards and another nomination at the 2006 Latin Billboard Music Awards for Latin Pop Airplay Song of the Year – Male.

Chart performance
"Nada Es Para Siempre" reached number-one during the week of August 27, 2005, which interrupted Shakira and Alejandro Sanz's "La Tortura" consecutive number-one weeks. This was the first time that Luis Fonsi had crossed over to the US Billboard Hot 100 which peaked at number 90.

Covers
"Nada Es Para Siempre" [Reggaeton version] (featuring Adassa) – 3:40
"Nada Es Para Siempre" [Salsa version] – 4:51

References

2005 singles
2005 songs
Luis Fonsi songs
Spanish-language songs
Universal Music Latino singles
2000s ballads
Rock ballads